Louis "Lou" Natale (January 5, 1950 – March 31, 2019) was an award-winning Canadian composer based in Toronto, who founded Natale Music in 1981.

Early life 
Natale's musical life began with listening to his sister playing classics and popular standards at the piano, followed by his own piano studies at age 8, adding accordion at 12 and guitar and percussion in his teens, when he began writing songs and singing and playing in local bands. He attended McQuaid Jesuit High School in Rochester, N.Y. and St. Michael's College, University of Toronto, where he earned a Bachelor of Arts degree. After university, he studied under Darwyn Aitken, one of Canada's premier symphonic piano teachers, and then studied jazz theory and composition with saxophonist/band leader Ted Moses.

Career
Lou entered the world of film scoring in the early 1980s when asked by a friend, screenwriter Steve Lucas, if he had thought of composing for film. Lucas knew Lou as a songwriter and had just had a script accepted by  Atlantis Films. After meeting with Atlantis co-founders Seaton McLean, Janice Platt and Michael MacMillan, Lou began work on the short film The Bamboo Brush, directed by a young Sturla Gunnarsson. The next film Atlantis produced was an adaptation of the Alice Munro story, Boys and Girls. Natale was hired to score under the direction of Don McBrearty, and the film went on to win the Oscar for Best Live Action Short Film.

Natale won a Genie Award for Best Song ("Cowboys Don’t Cry," directed by Anne Wheeler), received six Gemini nominations, and scored many other award-winning shows, including A Child’s Christmas in Wales, narrated by Denholm Elliott. Lou's other credits include the Canadian series Traders, Blue Murder, Psi Factor, The Ray Bradbury Theatre, and The Twilight Zone. American series included Mutant X, Playmakers and Tilt, as well as many television movies and feature films, including Eugene Levy’s Sodbusters, the CBS thriller Adrift, ABC's To Brave Alaska, Madonna: Innocence Lost for Fox, NBC's Journey Into Darkness: The Bruce Curtis Story and Christmas in America, Showtime's reworking of the Kurt Vonnegut classic Harrison Bergeron, ESPN's Hustle: The Pete Rose Story, and CTV's The Horses of McBride.

Natale passed away in Toronto, at age 69, in March 2019.

Television scores

Film scores

External links 
 Lou Natale's Website

References 

1950 births
Canadian film score composers
Living people
Male film score composers
Musicians from Toronto
University of Toronto alumni